Shahram Khan Tarakai is a Pakistani politician who was Provincial Minister of Khyber Pakhtunkhwa of Local Government, Elections and Rural Development, in office from 29 August 2018 till 26 January 2020. He had been a member of the Provincial Assembly of Khyber Pakhtunkhwa from August 2018 till January 2023.

Previously, he was a member of the Provincial Assembly of Khyber  Pakhtunkhwa  from May 2013 to May 2018. During his first tenure as Member of the Khyber Pakhtunkhwa Assembly, he served as Provincial Minister for agriculture, Health between June 2013 and May 2018.
He was dismissed as a minister of health on 26 January 2020 by the Chief minister on the instructions of Prime minister Imran Khan.

Early life 
Shahram Khan was born in Tarakai House of Tehsil Razar, District Swabi, Khyber Pakhtunkhwa to a well known Industrialist and Politician Liaqat Khan Tarakai. He is the eldest amongst his siblings.

Shahram Khan got his early life education at Fazal Haq College Mardan  and Edwards College Peshawar before travelling to the UK  and Australia for further studies.

Political career
Khan for the first time entered in to politics in 2005 after coming from abroad when he ran for District Nazim in 2005 Local Government Elections and won the office on huge margin.

In his tenure as a District Nazim, both Pervez Musharraf the then President of Pakistan and Shaukat Aziz the then Prime Minister of Pakistan visited Swabi and announced huge amount for Municipal purposes.

He co-founded Awami Jamhuri Ittehad Pakistan (AJIP) in 2010.

He ran for the seat of the National Assembly of Pakistan as a candidate of AJIP from Constituency NA-13 (Swabi-II) in 2013 Pakistani general election but was unsuccessful. He received 14,495 votes and lost the seat to Asad Qaiser. In the same election, he was elected to the Provincial Assembly of Khyber Pakhtunkhwa as a candidate of AJIP from Constituency PK-32 (Swabi-II). He received 20,111 votes and defeated Amir Rehman, a candidate of Awami National Party (ANP). Following the election, AJIP forged coalition with Pakistan Tehreek-e-Insaf (PTI).

On 14 June 2013, he was inducted into the provincial Khyber Pakhtunkhwa cabinet of Chief Minister Pervez Khattak and was appointed as Provincial Minister of Khyber Pakhtunkhwa for agriculture.

In a cabinet reshuffle in March 2014, he was appointed as Provincial Minister of Khyber Pakhtunkhwa for health and was given the status of the senior minister in the cabinet. In November 2015, AJIP merged with PTI. Shahram Khan in a public gathering of PTI on 22 November 2015 announced the merger of both the parties for the betterment of the people of Swabi. Imran Khan was also present in the gathering as a chief guest.

He was re-elected to the Provincial Assembly of Khyber Pakhtunkhwa as a candidate of PTI from Constituency PK-47 (Swabi-V) in 2018 Pakistani general election.

On 29 August 2018, he was inducted into the provincial Khyber Pakhtunkhwa cabinet of Chief Minister Mahmood Khan and was appointed as Provincial Minister of Khyber Pakhtunkhwa for Local Government, Elections and Rural Development. According to the vision of Imran Khan he has passed Local Government bill 2019 from the Provincial Assembly of Khyber Pakhtunkhwa understanding the importance of devolution of power.

He was among the three ministers who were abruptly removed from KP cabinet on charges of creating grouping in the ruling PTI. These allegations were denied by Shahram Tarakai.

References

People from Swabi District
Living people
Year of birth missing (living people)
Pashtun people
Khyber Pakhtunkhwa MPAs 2013–2018
Pakistan Tehreek-e-Insaf MPAs (Khyber Pakhtunkhwa)
Khyber Pakhtunkhwa MPAs 2018–2023